James Watson (16 January 1924 – 11 April 1996) was a Scottish footballer who played as an inside forward for Armadale Thistle, Motherwell, Huddersfield Town and Dunfermline Athletic. He won the Scottish Cup with Motherwell in 1952, scoring in the 4–0 victory over Dundee (having also played in a defeat to Celtic in the previous year's final), and also claimed a winner's medal in the 1950–51 edition of the Scottish League Cup, a 3–0 win against the strong Hibernian team of the era.

Watson earned two caps for Scotland, both against Northern Ireland. He was also selected for the Scottish Football League XI.

References

1924 births
1996 deaths
Dunfermline Athletic F.C. players
Association football inside forwards
Armadale Thistle F.C. players
Huddersfield Town A.F.C. players
Motherwell F.C. players
Footballers from North Lanarkshire
Scotland international footballers
Scottish Football League players
Scottish footballers
English Football League players
Scottish Football League representative players
Scottish Junior Football Association players